Star Begotten is a 1937 novel by H. G. Wells. It tells the story of a series of men who conjecture upon the possibility of the human race being altered, by genetic modification, by Martians to replace their own dying planet.

The first (British) edition of this novel gives the title as two words: Star Begotten. The title is hyphenated in the first U.S. edition: Star-Begotten.

The book readdresses the idea of the existence of Martians, which Wells had written about in The War of the Worlds (1898). The dialogue of Star Begotten makes brief references to Wells's earlier novel, referring to it as having been written by "Jules Verne, Conan Doyle, one of those fellows".

Plot introduction

The protagonist of the story Joseph Davis, who is an author of popular histories, becomes overtaken with suspicion that he and his family have already been exposed and are starting to change.

In other works
At the end of Sherlock Holmes's War of the Worlds (1975), Professor Challenger indicates that the "Martians" (not really from Mars in the story) from The War of the Worlds are the same Martians from Star Begotten, and hints at the start of the Martian alteration-program. It is possible that John Wyndham's The Midwich Cuckoos (1957), adapted as Village of the Damned in 1960, was similarly influenced by Star Begotten.

In Nigel Kneale's 1958-59 BBC television serial Quatermass and the Pit and its 1967 movie adaptation, a discovery of strange fossils reveals that human evolution was altered by a dying race of Martians, in order to leave a legacy behind. This may have been inspired by the tale of HG Wells.

References

External links 
 

1937 science fiction novels
British science fiction novels
Novels by H. G. Wells
War of the Worlds written fiction
Chatto & Windus books
1937 British novels